The Zhuoshui River, also spelled Choshui or Jhuoshuei River, is the longest river in Taiwan.

The river serves as an unofficial boundary between the north and south of Taiwan.

It is dammed in its upper reaches by the Wushe and Wujie Dams, and further downstream by the Jiji Weir.

The Zhuoshui River environment has in recent years been seriously degraded both by the construction of a dam across the river at Jiji and by the ongoing activities of the concrete industry.

Tributaries
 Chenyoulan River
 Shuili River
 Kashe River

Bridges
 Xiluo Bridge

Dams
 Jiji Weir
 Wujie Dam

See also
 List of rivers of Taiwan
 Regions of Taiwan

References

Further reading

Rivers of Taiwan
Landforms of Changhua County
Landforms of Yunlin County
Landforms of Nantou County